Luporini is an Italian surname. Notable people with the surname include:

Gaetano Luporini (1865–1948), Italian composer
Gaetano Giani Luporini (1936–2022), Italian composer, grandson of Gaetano
Sandro Luporini (born 1930), Italian painter, lyricist and writer

Italian-language surnames